The Anare Nunataks are a group of mainly snow-covered ridges with exposed rock summits rising to , standing  south of the Stinear Nunataks in Mac. Robertson Land. First visited in November 1955 by an Australian National Antarctic Research Expeditions (ANARE) party led by John Béchervaise, the name is taken from the acronym of the expedition.

The Anare Nunataks include Mount Macklin.

References 

Nunataks of Mac. Robertson Land